WFCX (100.5 FM) is a radio station in Apalachicola, Florida, United States. The station serves Franklin, Gulf, Liberty, and Wakulla Counties in northern Florida and is currently owned by Michael and Lena Allen through licensee East Bay Broadcasting Inc.

Long known as Oyster Radio, in 2022, East Bay Broadcasting acquired the higher-power WOCY (106.5 FM) in 2022 and moved Oyster Radio there on April 1; the two stations swapped the WOCY and WOYS call signs the same day. A new "trop-rock" format is slated to debut on the 100.5 frequency. The station changed its call sign again on August 29, 2022, to WFCX.

References

External links

FCX
1989 establishments in Florida
Radio stations established in 1989